Destination is the fourteenth studio album by German rock band Eloy, released in 1992. It was the second album to be recorded with the new line-up of Frank Bornemann and Michael Gerlach. It also marked the return of Klaus-Peter Matziol, who last played with Eloy on the 1984 Metromania album.

Track listing
Music by Frank Bornemann and Michael Gerlach. Lyrics by Frank Bornemann and Diana Baden.
 "Call of the Wild"  – 7:01
 "Racing Shadows"  – 7:12
 "Destination"  – 7:41
 "Prisoner in Mind"  – 4:27
 "Silent Revolution"  – 7:55
 "Fire and Ice"  – 5:11
 "Eclipse of Mankind"  – 6:29
 "Jeanne d'Arc"  – 7:37

Personnel
Frank Bornemann – guitar, vocals
Michael Gerlach – keyboards

Guest musicians
Nico Baretta – drums (all tracks)
Klaus-Peter Matziol – bass (2, 5)
Detlev Goy – bass (1, 6, 8)
Helge Engelke – bass (3, 4), electric rhythm (4) and acoustic (6) guitars, guitar solo (6)
Kai Steffen – guitar solo (5)
Lenny McDowell – flute (1, 3)
Classical Choir (8) arranged and conducted by Peter Chrastina

References

1992 albums
Eloy (band) albums